Justin Jason Roberts (born December 29, 1979) is an American professional ring announcer currently signed to All Elite Wrestling (AEW). Best known for his time in World Wrestling Entertainment (WWE), Roberts regularly announced for its pay-per-views and television shows like Raw, SmackDown, ECW, and Superstars.

Career

Early career (1996–2002)
Roberts began watching professional wrestling after he saw an edition of Saturday Night's Main Event and met Kerry Von Erich and The Ultimate Warrior at a hotel in Wisconsin. The combined events inspired Roberts to become a fan of wrestling. He also briefly trained as a referee so he could be in the same ring as Curt Hennig, of whom he was a big fan.

Roberts began ring announcing at age 16 for local professional wrestling promotion Pro Wrestling International, and announced his first match in November 1996. While studying Media Arts and Communications at the University of Arizona from 1998 to 2002, Roberts worked for other independent promotions such as the American Wrestling Alliance, All Pro Wrestling, and Impact Zone Wrestling. During this time, he also announced for the Toughman Contest.

World Wrestling Entertainment (2002–2014)

In 2002, he got a job on SmackDown!, followed later by a move to the Raw brand. He also worked on Velocity and Heat shows while touring as the full-time Raw live event announcer.

Most notably, Roberts announced the ECW show each week on the Sci Fi Network until September 2007, before swapping with SmackDown!'s Tony Chimel.

Roberts reached the peak of his profession when he announced the main event of WrestleMania XXIV between Edge and The Undertaker on March 30, 2008.

In addition to announcing SmackDown and pay-per-view matches, Roberts would also announce on WWE Superstars, including its inaugural episode on April 16, 2009. Beginning on September 28, 2009, Roberts took over the Raw announcing duties from the departing Lilian Garcia.

On the June 7, 2010 episode of Raw, Roberts was attacked by the rookie wrestlers who had competed in the first season of NXT. During the segment, Roberts was strangled with his own tie by Daniel Bryan, which led to Bryan's release, as WWE felt the incident was too violent for their TV-PG programming. At the SummerSlam pay-per-view two months later however, Bryan returned to WWE.

At WrestleMania XXVII, Roberts worked as the sole announcer for the whole show, with the exception of the announcement of the Hall of Fame class of 2011, which was announced as usual by Howard Finkel.

On October 13, 2014 immediately after Raw, WWE released Roberts after opting not to renew his contract. Following this, it was reported that Roberts would be working on an autobiography.

Independent circuit (2014–2019) 
Roberts was guest ring announcer at the House of Hardcore 9 event and a couple of other events soon after leaving WWE. In 2016, Roberts was the ring announcer for the UR Fight iPPV Events which included his announcing for the Angle vs. Mysterio match.

Since 2015, Roberts has worked for the band Tool hosting and moderating their VIP events.

On July 13, 2018, it was announced Roberts would commentate the All In broadcast with Don Callis, Sean Mooney, Excalibur, Alicia Atout, Ian Riccaboni, and Bobby Cruise. Roberts along with Cruise were the ring announcers at All In.

All Elite Wrestling (2019–present) 
On April 3, 2019, Roberts was hired by All Elite Wrestling (AEW) as its main ring announcer, nicknamed "The Dapper Yapper".

Other media
Roberts has appeared in "Graves" and "The Messengers" recently. He has also done some acting and was featured in such movies as Stuart Saves His Family, The Guardian and Soul Food. As a child, he was an extra in Sleepless in Seattle, Blue Chips and Only the Lonely. He also appeared in an episode of The Jerry Springer Show.

He released his autobiography, Best Seat in the House, on April 1, 2017.

References

External links

 
 
 

1979 births
Living people
People from Chicago
Writers from Scottsdale, Arizona
Professional wrestling announcers
All Elite Wrestling personnel